John Marcus Bishop (born 30 November 1966) is an English comedian, presenter, actor and former footballer.

Bishop formerly played football as a midfielder for Winsford United F.C., Crewe Alexandra F.C., Runcorn F.C., Rhyl F.C., Witton Albion F.C., Hyde United F.C., Southport F.C.,  Stalybridge Celtic F.C., Northwich Victoria F.C., Caernarfon Town F.C. and Holywell Town F.C.

His first television appearance was in 2007 on the RTÉ topical-comedy show The Panel, where he was a regular panelist until 2008. He subsequently appeared in seasons 3 and 4 of the E4 teen drama Skins and the Ken Loach film Route Irish. He has also hosted his own shows such as John Bishop's Britain (2010–2011), John Bishop's Only Joking (2013), and two versions of  The John Bishop Show (2015, 2022). He also has played the companion Dan Lewis in Doctor Who from 2021 to 2022.

Bishop had a regular Sunday slot on Liverpool radio station Radio City called Bishop's Sunday Service. He is also known for his charity work, most notably raising £4.2 million for Sport Relief 2012.

Early life
John Bishop was born at Mill Road Hospital in the Liverpool suburb of West Derby on 30 November 1966, the son of housewife Kathleen (née Hackett) and labourer Edward Bishop, a couple from nearby Huyton. He has an older brother, footballer Eddie, and two older sisters, Kathy and Carol. He grew up mostly in the Cheshire towns of Runcorn and Winsford, attending Murdishaw West Primary School and Brookvale Comprehensive School (now known as Ormiston Bolingbroke Academy). He briefly studied English at Newcastle Polytechnic, and gained a BA in Social Science from Manchester Polytechnic. He later became a medical representative for the pharmaceutical company Syntex, where he worked until leaving in 2006 to pursue his comedy career full-time at the age of 40.

Career

Bishop performed stand-up comedy for the first time in Manchester in October 2000, and the following year, made it to the final of all the major new act competitions, including So You Think You're Funny, the Daily Telegraph Open Mic Awards, the BBC New Comedy Awards, and the City Life North West Comedian of The Year Award, which he won. In 2002, he was named best newcomer by BBC Radio Merseyside, and in 2004, he won the North West Comedy Award for best stand-up. In 2009, Bishop appeared as the first act on Michael McIntyre's Comedy Roadshow in Manchester. That year, he appeared at the Edinburgh Fringe Festival, where his show Elvis Has Left the Building was nominated for an "Eddie" (Edinburgh Comedy Award).

In 2009, Bishop appeared in Channel 4's series Comedy Showcase and was a contestant on Celebrity Mastermind. He also appeared in the BBC Three sitcom Lunch Monkeys as fireman Terry. He has appeared five times on 5 Live's Fighting Talk quiz show, claiming four victories on the programme. His material is drawn from his life's experiences, including fatherhood, cycling around the world, playing semi-professional football, and working as a nightclub doorman. Bishop's first television appearance was in 2007 on the RTÉ topical-comedy show The Panel, where he was a regular panelist until 2008. He then went onto the Channel 4 panel show 8 out of 10 Cats before appearing on the BBC's Live at the Apollo. In December 2009, Bishop started his own TV show on LFC TV called John Bishop Meets..., where he interviewed former Liverpool football players.

In 2010, Bishop was a celebrity team captain on What Do Kids Know? with Rufus Hound, Joe Swash and Sara Cox on Watch. He has also appeared on BBC's Mock the Week, and Radio 4's Act Your Age. In series 3 and series 4 of Skins, Bishop portrayed Emily and Katie Fitch's father. In 2010, Bishop appeared in Ken Loach's Route Irish, which premiered at the 2010 Cannes Film Festival. Bishop is a regular panelist on Sky1 show, A League of Their Own, as well as a stand-up/sketch show for BBC One titled John Bishop's Britain. On 11 July 2010, Bishop came runner-up in the second-ever game of How Many Peter Jones'? on ITV's James Corden's World Cup Live. He has appeared as a panellist on BBC programmes Have I Got News for You, Would I Lie to You?, and on QI. On 28 October 2010, he also guest hosted an episode of series 40 of Have I Got News For You.

On 12 February 2010, during an appearance on Friday Night with Jonathan Ross it was revealed that prior to his TV breakthrough, Bishop had worked as a warm-up for the show. In March 2011, Bishop and fellow comedians Alan Carr, James Corden, Catherine Tate, and David Walliams appeared in the video for Take That's single "Happy Now" for Comic Relief. On 24 June 2012, he appeared on Desert Island Discs. On 28 August and 4 September 2012, he appeared in Accused as Peter for two episodes. In late 2012, Bishop appeared on BBC genealogy series Who Do You Think You Are? and on an ITV one-off episode called Panto!, where he starred as a local Morecambe disc jockey called Lewis Loud. As of January 2013, Bishop hosts John Bishop's Only Joking on Sky 1.

On 28 July 2013, Bishop headlined the Vodafone comedy festival in Dublin's Iveagh Gardens. Before the gig, a reporter called Brian Boyd interviewed him about his recently replenished marriage and how his wife eventually found him funny again.

Bishop's autobiography titled How Did All This Happen? was published in October 2013. In November 2013, he hosted the 2013 Royal Variety Performance at the London Palladium theatre in the presence of Charles, Prince of Wales and Camilla, Duchess of Cornwall.

In December 2014, he appeared in A Night in with Olly Murs where he and Olly Murs had a lip-sync battle. In 2015, Bishop presented his own variety show on BBC One called The John Bishop Show.

In May 2015, Bishop appeared as a special guest at the Liverpool date of Murs's Never Been Better Tour and performed "Troublemaker" with him.

In January 2016, he took part in the BBC series Stargazing Live, appearing from the European Astronaut Centre, and following Tim Peake's astronaut training programme with a simulated spacewalk, underwater.

Since September 2016, Bishop has presented John Bishop: In Conversation With... for the W channel. Two series have been aired: the show will return for a third series.

On 21 September 2016, Bishop was confirmed to have a role in ITV drama series Fearless, which aired in 2017.

On 29 September 2016, Bishop announced that he would be going on tour for the fifth time in October and November 2017 with a show titled Winging It.

In August 2019, Bishop began presenting a football programme called Back of the Net for Amazon Prime Video with Peter Crouch and Gabby Logan.

On 8 September 2020, Bishop and writer, actor and director Tony Pitts launched their new podcast called Three Little Words. This podcast was launched on the Crowd Network podcasting platform, which has financial backing from John Bishop and was started by a group of ex-BBC executives.

On 1 January 2021, Bishop announced that he would join the cast of Doctor Who as Dan Lewis, a companion of the Thirteenth Doctor. On 28 January, it was announced that Bishop would appear as a contestant on the 4th series of The Great Stand Up to Cancer Bake Off in the spring of that year.

Awards
At the 2010 British Comedy Awards, Bishop won the Best Male Comedy Breakthrough Artist award. He became the Number 1 "Star in a reasonably priced car" on Top Gear on Sunday 23 January 2011 after he appeared on the BBC Two show. He drove the Kia Cee'd around the test track in 1 minute and 42.8 seconds to become the fastest star in the latest reasonably priced car, knocking Tom Cruise off the top. Bishop's record lasted nearly half a year until being knocked off by Rowan Atkinson (1 minute 42.2 seconds) on Sunday 17 July 2011. He was also the fastest in the League of Their Own skeleton race, beating Georgie Thompson and James Corden.

On 18 July 2014, Bishop was awarded an honorary fellowship at Liverpool John Moores University in recognition of his contribution to the arts and charity work during a ceremony at Liverpool's Anglican Cathedral.

On 11 July 2018, Bishop won the Celebrity Animal Champion award at the RSPCA Honours Awards for his work with rescue animals. On 25 July 2019, Bishop received an Honorary Doctor of Arts degree from Manchester Metropolitan University for his charity work, and the contributions he has made to comedy and the arts.

Charity work
In 1992, Bishop cycled from Sydney to Liverpool, raising £30,000 for the NSPCC.

On 30 March 2010, Bishop took part in Channel 4's Comedy Gala, a benefit show held in aid of Great Ormond Street Hospital, filmed live at the O2 Arena in London.

In 2012, Bishop completed a  triathlon from Paris to London in five days to raise money for the BBC charity Sport Relief. His "week of hell" began at the Eiffel Tower on 27 February, where he cycled  to Calais. The next day, he rowed across the English Channel as part of a team including Davina McCall, Andrew Flintoff, and Denise Lewis, then ran  from Dover to London in three days, finishing in Trafalgar Square on 2 March. On 23 March, during the Sport Relief telethon, it was announced that his efforts had raised £4.2 million. Also in 2012, he took part in The Justice Collective for their cover of The Hollies single "He Ain't Heavy, He's My Brother" for charities in aid of Hillsborough disaster victims. On 27 May 2012, he took part in the Soccer Aid match for Unicef, playing for the England team, who won 3–1 against the Rest of the World.

In 2014, Bishop once again took part in Sport Relief as a team captain for the Clash of the Titans event, competing against Sebastian Coe and his team. In May 2014, Bishop donated £96,000 to the Hillsborough Family Support Group after being moved by personal statements delivered by the victims' families at their inquests. On 8 June 2014, he took part in his second Soccer Aid football match, again playing for England, this time losing 4–2 to the Rest of the World. On 5 June 2016, he took part in his third Soccer Aid match, playing on England's team.

In 2020, Bishop donated 100 laptops to his former school, Brookvale Academy, as he warned of a “gulf” in society risks leaving children behind.

On 19 April 2016, Bishop served as host for a comedy gig at the Royal Albert Hall in aid of Teenage Cancer Trust.

Bishop competed in the Ciaran Geddes memorial match at the Deva Stadium, scoring two goals while playing with his brother Eddie for Chester.

Personal life
Bishop has been married to his wife Melanie since 1993, though they were separated for 18 months starting in 2000. They have three sons: Joe (born 1994), Luke (born 1996), and Daniel (born 1998). Until 2019, they lived at Whatcroft Hall in Northwich, Cheshire. The property is a Grade II listed Georgian mansion. In April 2019, he sold the home for £6.2 million to the HS2 rail project, despite his vocal criticism of the project.

Bishop enjoys playing football and is an avid Liverpool FC fan, a fact frequently brought up on the show A League of Their Own, on which he was a panelist. In July 2010, he took part in protests against then-owners of Liverpool FC, Tom Hicks and George Gillett, and later took part in a celebrity-studded protest video on YouTube.

Bishop pre-recorded a video message for the 2011 Labour Party conference, which was held in Liverpool.

Bishop has been a vegetarian since 1985, which he discussed on BBC Two's Something for The Weekend and his episode on food on his stand-up show John Bishop's Britain. In 2013, PETA declared him to be one of the "Sexiest Vegetarians" of the year.

In September 2016, Bishop was ranked tenth place on Forbes Top 10 Highest Paid Comedians List, earning £5.4 million a year, making him the UK's highest earning comedian.

On 30 December 2020, during the COVID-19 pandemic, Bishop revealed that he and his wife had tested positive for COVID-19 on Christmas Day and described it as the "worst illness [he has] ever had".

While driving in Wales on 21 July 2021, Bishop crashed his Land Rover Discovery after swerving to avoid another driver who had swerved to avoid a "big chicken". He was on his way to take a ferry to Ireland and was unhurt.

Filmography

Television

Film

Music videos
2011: Take That – "Happy Now" for Comic Relief
2012: The Justice Collective – "He Ain't Heavy, He's My Brother"

Stage
2009: One Night in Istanbul – Tom
2022–2023: Mother Goose – Vic

Tours
"Stick Your Job Up Your Ar**" Tour" (2007)
"The Elvis Has Left the Building Tour" (2010)
"The Sunshine Tour" (2011)
"The Rollercoaster Tour" (2012)
"Supersonic Tour" (2014)
"Winging It" (2017)
"Work In Progress" (2019)
"Right Here Right Now" (2021)

DVDs

References

External links

Official Website

Living people
1966 births
People from Liverpool
Alumni of Manchester Metropolitan University
Comedians from Lancashire
Male actors from Liverpool
Comedians from Liverpool
English male comedians
English footballers
Association football midfielders
Hyde United F.C. players
Southport F.C. players
Footballers from Liverpool
English male television actors
21st-century English male actors
21st-century English comedians